Böri Shad (fl. c. 627) (böri šad, "Wolf governor") was a Turkic prince or general who fought the Persians south of the Caucasus during the Third Perso-Turkic War. In this war the Western Turkic Khaganate was allied with Byzantium against Persia during the last great Byzantine-Persian war before the Arab conquests.

He was an appointed head of a provincial principality in the far western North Caucasus periphery of the Western Turkic Khaganate. A succession of princes, or shads, occupied that position. The principality of Böri Shad originated in 558 CE, when Kara-Churin (later named Tardu or Tardush), a brother of the ruling kagan, campaigned in Ural and Volga regions, but the lands he captured were given to his junior brother Turksanf and his cousin Buri-khan. From 576 through 583 CE, Tardu fought with the Byzantines, but, instead of himself, he appointed as head of the campaign his cousin Böri Shad, whose possessions were in the North Caucasus.

According to Movses Kagankatvatsi, Böri Shad was a 7th-century Göktürk prince and an ishad or general in the army of the Western Turkic Khaganate. He was the son of Bagha Shad, who may have been the yabgu or prince of the Khazars. (anachronistic since the Khazars were not yet a separate polity.) Böri Shad's uncle was Tong Yabghu Khagan, the khagan of the Western Göktürks.

Böri Shad was probably commander of the Khazar forces during the Third Perso-Turkic War in the Caucasus in 627–629. Under Böri Shad's command the Khazars sacked many cities in Caucasian Albania and attempted to establish a firm foothold in Transcaucasia.

Following Tung Yabghu's instructions, Böri Shad suggested to the Persian satrap of Aghvania and to Catholicos Viro that they should acknowledge the Khagan as their overlord. The governor refused to pay homage to the Turks and fled to Persia. The Catholicos was also hesitant.

After the Turks started to plunder the cities, Viro escaped to the mountainous region of Artsakh, where the Turks managed to track him down. When asked to capitulate, the Catholicos summoned princes and potentates from across the country and asked them whether the Albanians should resist the invaders. It was decided that resistance was futile.

Viro personally brought the message of obedience and allegiance to Böri Shad, whose army encamped in the vicinity of Partav. The shad reproached Viro for his delays: "Why did you procrastinate with your visit? If only you were more expeditious, your country would have been spared the calamities brought about by my troops".

After paying homage to Böri Shad, the Catholicos asked him to free the Albanian prisoners. Böri Shad dispatched his bailiffs to search the tents. They found many young men hiding among the treasure and cattle and set them free.

In April 630 Böri Shad took advantage of dynastic disorders in the Sassanid Empire and dispatched Chorpan Tarkhan to conquer Armenia. Although the campaign was successful, Böri Shad had to flee to Central Asia after learning about the murder of Tong Yabghu later that year.

Notes

References
Artamonov, Mikhail. Istoriya Khazar. Leningrad, 1962.
Christian, David. A History of Russia, Mongolia and Central Asia. Blackwell, 1999.
Golden, Peter Benjamin. Introduction to the History of the Turkic Peoples. Wiesbaden: Harrasowitz, 1992.
Gumilev, Lev. The Gokturks, 1st ed. Moscow: Nauka, 1967.
Pletneva, Svetlana. Khazary, 2nd ed. Moscow: Nauka, 1986.

Göktürk khagans
Ashina house of the Turkic Empire
7th-century Turkic people